Ahmad Badri bin Mohamad Zahir is the former Secretary-General of the Treasury of Malaysia. As secretary-general, Ahmad Badri also serves as Chairman of the Inland Revenue Board of Malaysia (LHDN), Retirement Fund (Incorporated) (KWAP) and the Public Sector Home Financing Board (LPPSA). He also currently is the chairman of Employees Provident Fund (EPF) and sits on the board of directors of Permodalan Nasional Berhad (PNB), Central Bank of Malaysia (BNM), Tabung Haji and the Perbadanan Insurans Deposit Malaysia (PIDM) as an ex officio member. He also serves as a non-independent non-executive director at Tenaga Nasional.

Education
Ahmad Badri holds a Master of Business Administration (MBA) from the University of Hull, United Kingdom. He also obtained Diplomas in Land and Property Management from the MARA University of Technology and Public Administration from the National Institute of Public Administration (Malaysia) respectively.

Career
Ahmad Badri had served in various senior posts within the Ministry of Finance (Malaysia) for more than 20 years before being appointed as its secretary-general. His last post before being promoted was as deputy secretary-general (Management), succeeding Ismail Bakar, who was chosen to ascend to the office of Chief Secretary to the Government of Malaysia.

Honours
  :
  Commander of the Order of Loyalty to the Crown of Malaysia (PSM) - Tan Sri (2019)

  :
  Knight Companion of the Order of Loyalty to the Royal House of Kedah (DSDK) - Dato' (2016)
  Knight Commander of the Glorious Order of the Crown of Kedah (DGMK) - Dato' Wira (2019)

  :
  Companion Class II of the Exalted Order of Malacca (DPSM) - Datuk (2012)

  :
  Grand Knight of the Order of Sultan Ahmad Shah of Pahang (SSAP) – Dato' Sri (2020)

References

External links 
 
 

Living people
Alumni of the University of Hull
Government of Malaysia
Malaysian people of Malay descent
Year of birth missing (living people)
Commanders of the Order of Loyalty to the Crown of Malaysia